Magnolia obovata, the Japanese cucumber tree, Japanese bigleaf magnolia, or Japanese whitebark magnolia, is a species of Magnolia, native to Japan and the adjacent Kurile Islands. It grows at altitudes near sea level up to 1,800 m in mixed broadleaf forests.

Description

It is a medium-sized deciduous tree 15–30 m tall, with slate grey bark. The leaves are large, 16–38 cm (rarely to 50 cm) long and 9–20 cm (rarely 25 cm) broad, leathery, green above, silvery or greyish pubescent below, and with an acute apex. They are held in whorls of five to eight at the end of each shoot. The flowers are also large, cup-shaped, 15–20 cm diameter, with 9-12 creamy, fleshy tepals, red stamens; they have a strong scent, and are produced in early summer after the leaves expand. The fruit is an oblong-cylindric aggregate of follicles 12–20 cm long and 6 cm broad, bright pinkish red, each follicle containing one or two black seeds with a fleshy orange-red coating.

Uses
The wood is strong, light, and easy to work, sought by craftsmen. In parts of Japan, the large leaves are used for wrapping food, and also as a makeshift dish to grill meat or vegetables, such as leeks, mushrooms, and miso in hoba miso.

References

Hunt, D. (ed). (1998). Magnolias and their allies. International Dendrology Society and Magnolia Society. 
Flora of China: Magnoliaceae (draft account)

obovata